Coy Randall Gibbs (December 9, 1972 – November 6, 2022) was an American NASCAR driver, assistant coach with the Washington Redskins, and co-owner of Joe Gibbs Racing. He was the son of Joe Gibbs, five-time NASCAR Cup Series championship-winning owner and Pro Football Hall of Famer.

Football
Gibbs played college football as a linebacker at Stanford University from 1991 to 1994. He led the Cardinal in tackles as a senior. In 2004, after his father was re-hired as the Redskins coach, he joined the team as an offensive quality control assistant, serving in that capacity until 2007.

Racing career
Gibbs made his NASCAR debut in the Craftsman Truck Series in 2000, sharing the driving duties of the No. 20 Chevrolet with his brother J. D. In 2001, he began racing a full-time schedule, posting two top-five finishes, and finishing 10th in points both in 2001 and 2002.  In 2003, he replaced Mike McLaughlin in the Busch Series, nailing down two top-ten finishes and being named runner-up in the Rookie of the Year race to David Stremme. He retired from racing at the conclusion of the season.

Kevin Harvick incident
One of Gibbs' more notable moments in NASCAR came in 2002, when he and Kevin Harvick raced in the spring Truck Series race at Martinsville Speedway. Gibbs, driving the #20 truck for his father's team, made contact with Harvick, who was driving the #6 truck that he owned, during the race. Harvick retaliated later on by intentionally wrecking Gibbs' after a restart, which resulted in the #6 being parked for the remainder of the race. Although Harvick denied his actions were intentional, radio communications proved otherwise and, since Harvick was already on probation after he got into a physical altercation with Greg Biffle after the Busch Series race at Bristol Motor Speedway two weeks earlier, the incident with Gibbs resulted in Harvick being suspended from the Cup Series race at Martinsville one day later. NASCAR determined that Harvick had violated his probation he was put on a month prior for an altercation with Greg Biffle.

Motorcycle racing team
In August 2007, Gibbs announced the formation of Joe Gibbs Racing Motocross (JGRMX) competing in the AMA motocross and supercross championships. The raceshop for JGRMX was less than a 1 mile away from the NASCAR Cup Series teams located in Huntersville, North Carolina. Gibbs headed up the operation along with help from motocross industry veteran David Evans.

Personal life and death 
Originally from Fayetteville, Arkansas, Gibbs lived in Cornelius, North Carolina with his wife Heather and their four children, sons Ty, Case, and Jett, and daughter Elle.

Gibbs died in his sleep on November 6, 2022, at the age of 49, the night during which his son Ty won the 2022 NASCAR Xfinity Series championship. The cause of his death has not been announced. His death was announced just prior to the 2022 NASCAR Cup Series Championship Race, and a moment of silence was held in his honor. Multiple drivers, including Christopher Bell, Denny Hamlin, Kyle Busch, and eventual race winner Joey Logano, a former Joe Gibbs Racing driver, paid tribute to Gibbs before and after the race, with Logano dedicating his race victory and championship to him. The death prompted Ty to withdraw from the Cup Series season finale scheduled for the next day; he was replaced by Daniel Hemric for the race.

Motorsports career results

NASCAR
(key) (Bold – Pole position awarded by qualifying time. Italics – Pole position earned by points standings or practice time. * – Most laps led.)

Busch Series

Craftsman Truck Series

References

External links
 

1972 births
2022 deaths
People from Huntersville, North Carolina
Racing drivers from Charlotte, North Carolina
Racing drivers from North Carolina
NASCAR drivers
Washington Redskins coaches
American football linebackers
Stanford Cardinal football players
DeMatha Catholic High School alumni
People from Cornelius, North Carolina
Joe Gibbs Racing drivers
Coaches of American football from North Carolina
Players of American football from North Carolina